Kalateh-ye Soltani (also Romanized as Kalāteh-ye Solţānī; also known as Kalāteh-ye Solţān) is a village in Zeberkhan Rural District, Zeberkhan District, Nishapur County, Razavi Khorasan Province, Iran. At the 2006 census, its population was 129, in 36 families.

References 

Populated places in Nishapur County